Víctor Medina Martínez (born October 9, 1964 or 1965 in San Luis Potosí City, San Luis Potosí) is a Mexican former professional footballer and manager.

References

1960s births
Living people
Mexican football managers
C.D. Veracruz footballers
Liga MX players
Footballers from San Luis Potosí
People from San Luis Potosí City
Association footballers not categorized by position
Mexican footballers